Karan Suchak is an Indian television actor. He is known for his role in  Siya Ke Ram as Lakshmana ; Akhilesh Pandey in Meri Hanikarak Biwi and Dr. Anurag Basu in Thoda sa Baadal Thoda sa Paani.

Early life and career 

Suchak was born in Ahmedabad and is a Gujarati. He debuted in TV serials with a supporting role of Sambhav Malik in Star Plus's Ek Hazaaron Mein Meri Behna Hai and secondly appeared in Life OK's Savitri as Vikrant.

In the last quarter of 2013, he entered Ekta Kapoor's popular daily TV soap Pavitra Rishta in the role of Shekhar Gupta. Few months later he was noticed when he began portraying Draupadi's brother Dhrishtadyumna in the epic TV series Mahabharat via Star Plus. Suchak portrayed Vikramaditya in Sony Pal's Singhasan Battisi from 2014–15. 

In 2015, he was roped in for Maharakshak: Devi. Next, he bagged Star Plus's Siya Ke Ram as Lakshmana. In 2017, Suchak was seen in historic series Peshwa Bajirao as Baji Rao I alongside Megha Chakraborty and Ishita Ganguly. 

In October 2017, he was signed in for &TV's new venture Meri Hanikarak Biwi to star opposite Jiaa Shankar as Akhilesh Pandey. The series premiered in December 2017 and went off air after a good TV run in December 2019. From 2021 to 2022, he is appearing as Anurag Basu in Colors TV's show Thoda sa Baadal Thoda sa Paani opposite Ishita Dutta.

Personal life 
He is married to his long time girlfriend Nandita. The two first met for professional reasons when Nandita was into celebrity marketing.

Television

References

External links 

 

Indian male television actors
Living people
Place of birth missing (living people)
1986 births
Gujarati people
Male actors from Ahmedabad